is a station in southeast Tokyo, Japan. There is Nakanobu Station on the other end of Nakanobu Skip Road.

Station layout
Two ground-level side platforms.

History 
August 28, 1927 Opened

External links   
  Ebaranakanobu Station (Tokyu)  

Railway stations in Tokyo
Railway stations in Japan opened in 1927
Tokyu Ikegami Line
Stations of Tokyu Corporation